Christoph Kunz (born 24 March 1982) is an alpine skier who won a gold and a silver medal for Switzerland at the 2010 Winter Paralympics. Kunz also represented Switzerland at the 2014 Winter Paralympics in Sochi winning a gold medal in the giant slalom.

References 

1982 births
Sit-skiers
Swiss male alpine skiers
Paralympic alpine skiers of Switzerland
Alpine skiers at the 2010 Winter Paralympics
Alpine skiers at the 2014 Winter Paralympics
Paralympic gold medalists for Switzerland
Paralympic silver medalists for Switzerland
Living people
Medalists at the 2010 Winter Paralympics
Medalists at the 2014 Winter Paralympics
Paralympic medalists in alpine skiing
21st-century Swiss people